Jonathan Rudd may refer to:

 Jonathan Rudd, British politician - see 2012 London Assembly election
 Jonathan Rudd, co-editor of The I Inside
 Jonathan Rudd, a character in the Western film 5 Card Stud

Jonathon Rudd
 Jonathon D. Rudd (1840–1920), American planter, Confederate officer, and  politician

John Rudd
 John Rudd (disambiguation)